The Damma Glacier is a 2 km long glacier (2005) situated in the Urner Alps in the canton of Uri in Switzerland. In 1973 it had an area of 5.09 km2.

See also
List of glaciers in Switzerland
Swiss Alps

External links

Swiss glacier monitoring network

Glaciers of the canton of Uri
Glaciers of the Alps